General elections were held in the Cook Islands on 14 June 2018 to elect the 24 members of the 15th Cook Islands Parliament.

The nationalist Cook Islands Party, led by the Prime Minister, Henry Puna, attempted to win a third consecutive term in government. However, the elections resulted in a hung parliament, with the opposition Democratic Party led by Tina Browne becoming the largest party, although Browne failed to win a seat, losing in Rakahanga constituency.

The Democratic Party won 11 seats, the Cook Islands Party 10 seats, One Cook Islands Movement one seat, with independent candidates winning two seats. Following the election, the Cook Islands Party joined forces with the independents and One Cook Islands to retain power.

Electoral system
The Cook Islands a self-governing island country in the South Pacific Ocean in free association with New Zealand. Its government uses the Westminster system, with the 24 members of the Parliament of the Cook Islands elected from single-member constituencies by first-past-the-post voting. The Parliamentary term is four years. As of 12 June 2018, there were 10,917 people enrolled to vote in the elections.

Results
Final results were published on 28 June.

By electorate

By island

Seats changing hands

Aftermath
Although the Democratic Party won the most seats, neither leader Tina Browne nor Deputy Leader James Beer were elected to Parliament. The constitution of the Cook Islands requires the Prime Minister to be a member of parliament.

On 7 July the Cook Islands party formed an alliance with independent MPs Rose Toki-Brown and Robert Tapaitau, and One Cook Islands movement's George Maggie to retain power. Toki-Brown, Tapaitau and Maggie were all appointed to Cabinet, replacing Ministers who had lost their seats.

Six electoral petitions were filed, challenging the results in Rakahanga, Murienua, Pukapuka-Nassau, Avatiu-Ruatonga-Palmerston, Ngatangiia, and Mauke. However, all of these petitions were rejected, confirming the result of the election. Rakahanga MP Toka Hagai resigned on 1 November 2018 after allegations of treating. In December 2018 the Court of Appeal ruled that Tina Browne had won the seat.

References

Elections in the Cook Islands
Cook Islands
2018 in the Cook Islands
Election and referendum articles with incomplete results